Yiğithan Güveli (born 16 May 1998) is a Turkish professional footballer who plays as a centre back for Adanaspor.

Professional career
Güveli joined Fenerbahçe at the age of 8, and developed solely in their youth academy. Güveli made his professional debut for Fenerbahçe in a 3-1 Süper Lig away victory against Adanaspor on 3 June 2017.

References

External links
 
 
 
 

1998 births
People from Derince
Living people
Turkish footballers
Turkey youth international footballers
Association football defenders
Fenerbahçe S.K. footballers
Yeni Malatyaspor footballers
Altınordu F.K. players
Ümraniyespor footballers
Adanaspor footballers
Süper Lig players
TFF First League players